Paul Alan Wetter, MD, FACOG, FACS is an American medical doctor, surgeon and innovator, noted for significant advances in minimally invasive and robotic surgery. Wetter is the founder and chairman emeritus of the Society of Laparoscopic and Robotic Surgeons.

Education 
Wetter received his B.S. from the University of Miami and Medical Degrees from the University of Miami School of Medicine. Wetter is a Clinical Professor Emeritus at the University of Miami's Leonard M. Miller School of Medicine.

Career 
Wetter performed some of the first laparoscopic pelviscopy procedures in North America. Wetter founded the Society of Laparoscopic and Robotic Surgeons.

Honors
Distinguished Alumni Award University of Miami School of Medicine (inducted 2004)
Alpha Omega Alpha Honor Medical Society (inducted 1993)
Omicron Delta Kappa,  National Leadership Society
Alliance for CME(ACCME) Medical Specialty Society Great Idea Award for work in developing ORReady, a worldwide initiative to improve surgical outcomes and save lives-2011
Worldwide Endometriosis March "Endo Hero of the Year 2018" for significant contributions to those affected by endometriosis and initiating subspecialty fellowship training.
Medical Training Magazine 2019 World Patient Safety Advocate

Positions
Chairman, Society of Laparoscopic and Robotic Surgeons(formerly Society of Laparoendoscopic Surgeons)
Managing Editor, Journal Society of Laparoscopic and Robotic Surgeons
Senior Advisor, International Society for Medial innovation and Technology
Editorial Advisory Board, General Surgery News
Executive Editor, Prevention and Management of Laparoendoscopic Complications, Medical Textbook, Four Editions

References 

American physicians
Living people
Year of birth missing (living people)
Leonard M. Miller School of Medicine alumni
University of Miami alumni
University of Miami faculty